Steven Andskär (born 30 October 1964, in Stockholm) is a Swedish race car driver. His long career started out in the mid-1970s when he competed in karting. After that—in the early 1980s—he  went from karting to driving several races in Formula 3. Later on he advanced to Formula 3000 which he raced in from 1986 until 1988. He continued after that with several sports car races and touring car races. Andskär has also participated in the famous Le Mans race seven times where he managed to finish 2nd in 1994. He also drove in the 24 Hours of Daytona.

He spent many years racing in the All Japan Sports Prototype Championship alongside George Fouché.

References

Swedish racing drivers
24 Hours of Le Mans drivers
International Formula 3000 drivers
World Touring Car Championship drivers
Living people
1964 births
World Sportscar Championship drivers
Sportspeople from Stockholm

Nismo drivers
24 Hours of Daytona drivers